Chris Angel may refer to:

 Chris Angel (wrestler) (born 1982), Puerto Rican wrestler
 Chris Angel, director of Wishmaster 3: Beyond the Gates of Hell and Wishmaster: The Prophecy Fulfilled
 Chris Angel (American football), Arena Football League player for the Colorado Crush
 Criss Angel (born 1967), illusionist, escapologist, stunt performer, and actor